Rodrigo da Silva Dias (born 26 January 1994 in Governador Valadares, Brazil) is a Brazilian professional footballer who plays as a forward for V.League 1 club Nam Định.

Club career

Brazil
Rodrigo Dias was born in Governador Valadares, Brazil. In 2009, he joined Cruzeiro Academy in Brazil. After developing his football skills at the academy level, he gained his first professional contract in senior team of Cruzeiro. In 2016, Rodrigo signed with Tombense, and after a short stint he then joined Palma. In 2017, he then moved to Uberaba, and after playing five league matches moved to Democrata. In Democrata, he was involved in 15 matches and scored seven times. After an impressive season in Democrata, in 2018 Rodrigo was offered by Tupi. After a short stint in Tupi, he then moved to Nacional de Muriaé, where he got eight league matches, and after America RJ gave him a good offer he went to Rio.

Beira-Mar
In June 2018, Rodrigo moved to Portugal and signed with Beira-Mar. He was the top scorer for Beira-Mar, scoring 20 goals in the league. After a successful season, he received offers from some Asian clubs.

Quảng Nam
In July 2019, Rodrigo signed with Vietnamese club Quảng Nam.

References 

Living people
1994 births
Brazilian footballers
Association football forwards
Cruzeiro Esporte Clube players
Tombense Futebol Clube players
Tupi Football Club players
America Football Club (Rio de Janeiro) players
Quang Nam FC players
V.League 1 players
S.C. Beira-Mar players
Brazilian expatriate footballers
Brazilian expatriate sportspeople in Vietnam
Expatriate footballers in Vietnam
People from Governador Valadares
Sportspeople from Minas Gerais